The Japan Ice Hockey Federation is the governing body of ice hockey in Japan. Japan was the first Asian nation to join the International Ice Hockey Federation (IIHF).

National teams
Men
Men U20
Men U18
Women
Women U18

Notable executives
Tsutomu Kawabuchi: member of the IIHF Hall of Fame.
Isao Kataoka:recipient of the Paul Loicq Award.
Shoichi Tomita: vice-president of the IIHF.
Yoshiaki Tsutsumi: member of the IIHF Hall of Fame.

2018 Japan qualification

Olympic Winter Games

Note: The 2018 IIHF Women's World Championship in the top division is not played during the Olympic seasons. The 2019 IIHF Women's World Championship will be played in Finland, city and dates to be announced.

2017 Japan participation

References

External links
Japan at IIHF.com

1930 establishments in Japan
Organizations based in Tokyo
Sports organizations established in 1930
Ice hockey governing bodies in Asia
Ice hockey in Japan
International Ice Hockey Federation members
Ice